Hikawa Dam  is a gravity dam located in Kumamoto Prefecture in Japan. The dam is used for flood control, irrigation and water supply. The catchment area of the dam is 57.4 km2. The dam impounds about 35  ha of land when full and can store 7100 thousand cubic meters of water. The construction of the dam was started on 1990 and completed in 2010.

See also
List of dams in Japan

References

Dams in Kumamoto Prefecture